Thomas Robinson (May 17, 1837 – May 12, 1915) was a United States Navy sailor and a recipient of the United States military's highest decoration, the Medal of Honor.

A native of Norway, Robinson immigrated to the United States and joined the Navy from the state of New York. On that day, while the Tallapoosa was off the coast of New Orleans, Louisiana, he attempted to rescue a shipmate, Landsman Wellington Brocar, from drowning. For this action, he was awarded the Medal of Honor two weeks later, on August 1.

Robinson's official Medal of Honor citation reads:
For heroic efforts to save from drowning Wellington Brocar, landsman, of the Tallapoosa, off New Orleans, 15 July 1866.

Robinson died at age 77 and was buried at Lakewood Cemetery in Minneapolis, Minnesota.

See also

List of Medal of Honor recipients in non-combat incidents

References

External links

1837 births
1915 deaths
Norwegian emigrants to the United States
United States Navy sailors
United States Navy Medal of Honor recipients
Norwegian-born Medal of Honor recipients
Non-combat recipients of the Medal of Honor